The 2013 New South Wales Cup season is the second tier rugby league competition held in New South Wales, after the National Rugby League. The 2012 season of the New South Wales Cup commences on Saturday 19 March 2013. 
The Minor Premiership has ended with Cronulla sitting on top of the ladder at 43 points as the teams head into finals. The grand final will be played at ANZ Stadium at the 2013 NRL Grand Final, and will be broadcast by Fox Sports.

Clubs
In 2013, 13 clubs are fielding teams in the New South Wales Cup.

*: The season the team joined is in the NSW Cup, not any other competition before this.

Ladder

Season

Round 1 
		
Windsor Wolves 	Bye

Round 2
		
Newcastle Knights 	Bye

Round 3
		
Illawarra Cutters 	Bye

Round 4
		
Wyong Roos 	Bye

Round 5
		
Mounties Bye

Round 6
		
Wests Tigers 	Bye

City v Country
		
Auckland Vulcans Bye

Round 7
		
Canterbury Bankstown Bulldogs 	Bye

Round 8
		
Windsor Wolves 	Bye

Round 9
		
Newtown Jets 	Bye

Round 10
		
North Sydney Bears 	Bye

Round 11
		
Cronulla Sharks 	Bye

Round 12
		
Mounties 	Bye

Round 13
		
Wyong Roos 	Bye

Round 14
		
Manly Sea Eagles 	Bye

Round 15
		
Newcastle Knights 	Bye

Round 16
		
Wentworthville Magpies 	Bye

Round 17
		
Auckland Vulcans 	Bye

Round 18

Round 19
		
North Sydney Bears 	Bye

Round 20
		
Wests Tigers 	Bye

Round 21
		
Manly Sea Eagles 	Bye

Round 22
		
Illawarra Cutters 	Bye

Round 23
		
Wentworthville Magpies 	Bye

Round 24
		
Canterbury Bankstown Bulldogs 	Bye

Round 25
		
Newtown Jets 	Bye

Round 26
		
Cronulla Sharks 	Bye

Player of the Year 
Wyong Roos hooker Mitch Williams was named NSW Cup Player of the Year.

Final Series Chart

Grand Final 
The Cronulla-Sutherland Sharks defeated the Windsor Wolves in the Grand Final. The Sharks were coached by Tony Herman and captained by Chad Townsend.

Media
The 2013 Season was included as part of Fox Sports' Saturday Afternoon of Football. At the Start of the season it would kick off with the NSW cup, followed by the Holden Cup and then the NRL, however in round 23 the Holden cup and NSW cup were swapped and continued like this for the rest of the season.

Ron Massey Cup 
The 2013 Ron Massey Cup season was the third tier rugby league competition held in New South Wales, after the National Rugby League and New South Wales Cup.

Finals Series

Player of the Year 
Dean Rysko from the Western Suburbs Magpies was named the Ron Massey Cup player of the year at the 2013 Brad Fittler Medal Night.

Grand Final 
Wentworthville Magpies 32 (D.Penese 3, J.MacKenzie, A.Takapu, B.Waters tries; A.FIuke 4 goals) beat Mounties 18 (G.Lahey, A.Tuatuaa, F.Pakutoa, N.Kassis tries; B.Lahey goal) in the Ron Massey Cup grand final at St Marys Leagues Stadium on Saturday, September 28, 2013.

Sydney Shield 
The 2013 Sydney Shield season was the fourth tier rugby league competition held in New South Wales, after the National Rugby League, New South Wales Cup and Ron Massey Cup. 
Eleven teams participated in the Sydney Shield competition.
 Asquith Magpies
 Auburn Warriors
 Belrose Eagles (Minor Premiers)
 Blacktown Workers (10th, two wins, one draw)
 Cabramatta Two Blues
 Guildford Owls
 Hills District Bulls
 Kingsgrove Colts (withdrew prior to the completion of the regular season). 
 Mounties
 Wentworthville Magpies
 Windsor Wolves

Finals Series 
The final series for the 2013 Sydney Shield was a top-five. This gave minor premiers, Belrose Eagles, a bye in the first week of the finals series. 
Finals Week 1 
Hills District Bulls beat Cabramatta Two Blues 30-14 at New Era Stadium on Saturday, September 7, 2013. Cabramatta were eliminated.
Wentworthville Magpies beat Mounties 76-22 at Ringrose Park. 
Finals Week 2 
Mounties beat Hills District Bulls 41-40, in golden-point extra time at Lidcombe Oval on Saturday, September 14, 2013. Hills District Bulls were eliminated. 
Belrose Eagles beat Wentworthville Magpies 38-34. 
Finals Week 3 
Wentworthville Magpies beat Mounties 56-30 at Kogarah Jubilee Oval.

Player of the Year 
Belrose Eagles fullback and captain-coach James Mortimer was named the Sydney Shield Player of the Year.

Grand Final 
Belrose Eagles beat Wentworthville Magpies 30-26 at St Marys Leagues Stadium on Saturday, September 28, 2013. The Eagles were captain-coached by James Mortimer.

See also

References

External links
 https://web.archive.org/web/20130119121017/http://www.nswrl.com.au/default.aspx?s=nswc-draw

New South Wales Cup
2013 in Australian rugby league
2013 in New Zealand rugby league